Luis Pompilio Páez Castellanos (born 18 December  1959) is a Colombian former footballer.

Club career
Pompilio began his playing career with Deportivo Pereira in 1981 through 1988 becoming the most capped player in the club's history.

Managerial career

Mexico National Team
In July 2017, Pompilo the assistant manager of Mexico, took charge after the manager Juan Carlos Osorio received a 6 match ban for his actions in 2017 FIFA Confederations Cup, which then excluded Osorio from participating in the management of the 2017 CONCACAF Gold Cup.

References

1959 births
Colombian footballers
Living people
Deportivo Pereira footballers
Once Caldas managers
2017 CONCACAF Gold Cup managers
Association football midfielders
Colombian football managers
People from Pereira, Colombia